Maria Fumaça is the debut album by Brazilian Funk band Banda Black Rio released in 1977 vinyl format by Atlantic Records (BR 20.022) and issued in 1994 CD format by WEA Music and distributed by Warner Music Brasil (450996349-2). It was listed by Rolling Stone Brazil as one of the 100 best Brazilian albums in history.

The album cover has two overlapping images of the seven members in circle. Photographer Sebastião Barbosa wanted to create a kaleidoscope-like image, but they only managed to take two photos, because as they prepared the second, the camera accidentally fell and hit Barrosinho's face, resulting in a big hematoma in his forehead which was pictured on the cover. The back cover has a picture of the members taken with fisheye lens.

Track listing

Personnel
 Oberdan Pinto Magalhães – soprano, alto and tenor saxophones
 Lucio J. da Silva – trombone
 José Carlos Barroso (Barrosinho) – trumpet
 Jamil Joanes - bass
 Claudio Stevenson – guitar
 Cristovão Bastos – electric piano and keyboards
 Luiz Carlos "Batera" Santos – drums and percussion

Technical personnel
Producer - Marco Mazzola 
Studio Direction – A. Lima F. (Liminha)
Recording Studios – Level and Hawai
Recording Technicians – Andy P. Mills and Don Lewis
Assistants – Brás, Edú, Gordinho, Leão and José Paulo
Mixing Studio – Westlake Audio
Mixing Technician – Marco Mazzola
Master – Kendun Records
Engineer – Humberto Gatica
Cutting – Continental
Cover Art – Gang
Photography – Sebastião Barbosa
CD Adaptation – Patricia do Valle Dias
Music Co-ordination – Don Filó
Rhythm Session – Nene, Geraldo Sabino, Wilson Canegal and Luna

References

1977 albums
Banda Black Rio albums